Edgar Padilla (born 9 May 1975) is a Puerto Rican basketball player. He competed in the men's tournament at the 1996 Summer Olympics.

References

External links
College stats @ sports-reference.com

1975 births
Living people
Basketball players at the 1996 Summer Olympics
Olympic basketball players of Puerto Rico
People from Toa Alta, Puerto Rico
Place of birth missing (living people)
Puerto Rican men's basketball players
UMass Minutemen basketball players
Guards (basketball)
20th-century Puerto Rican people